The Czech Men's National Floorball Team is the national floorball team of the Czech Republic, and a member of the International Floorball Federation. Its biggest successes are silver medals from the 5th World Championships in 2004 and 14th World Championships in 2022, which both took place in Switzerland. The team also won three bronze medals in 2010, 2014 and 2020. That makes Czech team the third most successful team after Sweden and Finland. Czech Republic has appeared in every World and European Championships tournament organised by the IFF.

World Championship

References

External links
Official webpage of Czech National Floorball team
Team page on IFF site

Men's national floorball teams
National sports teams of the Czech Republic
Floorball in the Czech Republic